James John Collins (30 October 1900 – 1 September 1967) was an Irish Fianna Fáil politician who served as a Teachta Dála (TD) for the Limerick West constituency from 1948 to 1967.

He joined the Irish Volunteers in 1915, holding various ranks before becoming adjutant to the West Limerick Brigade in October 1920. After the Anglo-Irish Treaty, he took charge of the Newcastle West RIC barracks and fought on the anti-treaty side in the Irish Civil War; he was arrested three times, escaped twice, and was finally released 24 December 1923. On the cessation of hostilities he worked as a farmer and a rate collector for Limerick County Council. He was a founder member of Fianna Fáil.

He was first elected to Dáil Éireann as a Fianna Fáil TD for the Limerick West constituency at the 1948 general election and re-elected at each election until his death in 1967. He was succeeded in the by-election of November 1967, by his son Gerry Collins. Another son, Michael J. Collins was later elected for the same constituency. His grandson Niall Collins, has served as a TD for Limerick County since 2011.

See also
Families in the Oireachtas

References

1900 births
1967 deaths
Fianna Fáil TDs
Members of the 13th Dáil
Members of the 14th Dáil
Members of the 15th Dáil
Members of the 16th Dáil
Members of the 17th Dáil
Members of the 18th Dáil
Politicians from County Limerick